Inger Charlotte Koefoed (born 17 September 1957 in Bagsværd), known as Lotte Koefoed and since her marriage as Lotte Pedersen, is a Danish rower. She is married to Olympic rower Bjarne Pedersen.

References

External links
 

1957 births
Living people
Danish female rowers
Rowers at the 1984 Summer Olympics
Olympic bronze medalists for Denmark
Olympic rowers of Denmark
Olympic medalists in rowing
Medalists at the 1984 Summer Olympics
People from Gladsaxe Municipality
Sportspeople from the Capital Region of Denmark